A bulldozer is a type of caterpillar-tracked tractor with a big front blade.

Bulldozer may also refer to:
 Bulldozer (band), an Italian metal band
 Bulldozer (EP), the second EP of the band Big Black
 Bulldozer (comics), two fictional Marvel Comics characters
 Bulldozer (book), a novel by Stephen W. Meader
 Bulldozer (film), a 1978 Italian film with Pauline Julien
 Bulldozer (microarchitecture), a CPU (processor) microarchitecture code-name by AMD
 Bulldozer (truck), a monster truck
 "The Bulldozer", a nickname for John Magufuli (1959–2021), fifth president of Tanzania